is a former Japanese football player.

Club statistics

References

External links

1985 births
Living people
Juntendo University alumni
Association football people from Osaka Prefecture
People from Ibaraki, Osaka
Japanese footballers
J2 League players
Sagan Tosu players
Association football midfielders